The following is a list of the MTV Europe Music Award winners and nominees for Best Collaboration.

Winners and nominees
Winners are listed first and highlighted in bold.

† indicates an MTV Video Music Award for Best Collaboration–winning artist.
‡ indicates an MTV Video Music Award for Best Collaboration–nominated artist that same year

2010s

2020s

See also
MTV Video Music Award for Best Collaboration

References

MTV Europe Music Awards
Awards established in 2015
Song awards